Biała Pierwsza refers to the following places in Poland:

 Biała Pierwsza, Łódź Voivodeship
 Biała Pierwsza, Lublin Voivodeship